Vladimir Rostislavovich Medinsky (born July 18, 1970) is a Russian political figure, academic and publicist who served as the Minister of Culture from May 2012 to January 2020. He is a member of the General Council of the United Russia party.

Biography

 
 
Medinsky was born in the city of Smila in the Cherkasy Oblast of the Ukrainian SSR.

Education
 1987–1992 – Student in the International Journalism Faculty in the Moscow State Institute of International Relations (МГИМО МИД России).
 1993–1994 – graduated in the Moscow State Institute of International Relations.

Career
1991–1992 – trainee in the Press Service of the Embassy of the USSR, and then Russia, in the United States, in Washington D.C.
 1992–1998 – Chairman of the Advertising agency called "Ya-Corporation".
 1998–1999 – adviser to the Director of the Federal Tax Police Service of the Russian Federation, and later become as Chairman of Department for Informational Policy in the Ministry of Tax and Revenue.
 1999–2000 –  Chairman of the Directorate of Central Election Commission Headquarters for Fatherland - All Russia Block, than a member of Unity Party.
 2000–2002 – Adviser to the Deputy Chairman of the State Duma, Georgiy Boos
 2002–2004 – Head of the Executive Committee of Moscow Organization of United Russia, Head of the Political campaign staff of "United Russia", in Moscow.
 2003 – elected as member of 4th session of the State Duma.
 2004–2005 – Deputy Chief of Central Executive Committee of "United Russia" for Information and Analysis.
 2006–2008 – President of the Russian Association of Social Communications.
  2007 – elected as member of 5th session of the State Duma, from regional group of the United Russia from Lipetsk Oblast. Worked as Coordinator from State Duma with the Parliament of South Korea.
 2010–2012 – Member of the Presidential Commission to counter the attempts to falsify history.
 November 2011 – Head of the Committee for Culture in the State Duma.
 May 2012–January 2020 – Minister of Culture in the Medvedev Cabinet.
 January 2020 - Assistant to the President of the Russian Federation
 28 February 2022 - Head of the Russian delegation in negotiations with Ukraine in Homel Belarus following the 2022 Russian invasion of Ukraine

Dissertations and accusation of plagiarism 
 1997 – defended Doctoral dissertation in political science
 1999 – defended Higher Doctoral dissertation in political science
 June 2011 – defended Higher Doctoral dissertation in history in the Russian State Social University: "Problems of objectivity in the coverage of Russian history from the second half of the 15th to 17th centuries".

The third thesis of 2011 has been widely debated in the Russian media and a large number of fragments have been shown to bear a significant resemblance to existing academic works, which caused numerous accusations of plagiarism.

On 23 May 2014, the Dissernet community, an informal group of academics and journalists concerned with dissertation plagiarism, declared to have found plagiarism in two previous dissertations by Medinsky, of 1997 and 1999. According to Dissernet's expertise, in the first thesis 87 pages out of 120 have been borrowed from the thesis of Medinsky's scientific advisor S. A. Proskurin. In the second thesis, 21 pages textually coincide with other people's works.

On 3 October 2017 the top Russian academic council recommended revoking Medinsky's 2011 doctorate. However, on 20 October 2017 a committee of a government agency that oversees the awarding of higher academic degrees ruled in the minister's favour by 16 to 6.

Views
Vladimir Medinsky has been described as a "nationalist enamoured of classicism and traditional values".

Medinsky supports the removal of Vladimir Lenin's body from Lenin's Mausoleum to bury it.

Medinsky believes that statues of Joseph Stalin should be erected in places where the majority of local people are in favour.

In 2013, Medinsky's Culture Ministry proposed an updated cultural policy blueprint. Calling for "a rejection of the principles of tolerance and multiculturalism", it emphasizes Russian "traditional values" and cautions against "pseudo-art" that may be at variance with those values.

In 2015, Medinsky called for the creation of a Russian "patriotic Internet" to combat Western ideas, adding that those who are against Russia are against the truth.

In 2019, Medinsky called the Chernobyl series “masterfully made” and “filmed with great respect for ordinary people”. Medinsky's father was one of the Chernobyl liquidators.

During the 2022 Russian invasion of Ukraine, Medinsky stated that “We stand for peace”.

Honours 
 2015: Commander in the Order of Cultural Merit.

Bibliography

 The Wall (Стена), 2012, 
 Myths about Russia (Мифы о России), Series of books by Vladimir Medinskiy
 Legal basis for commercial advertising by Vladimir Medinskiy and Kirill Vsevolozhskiy, 
 Scoundrels and geniuses PR. From Rurik to Ivan the Terrible by V. Medinskiy, 2011,

References

External links

Official Website (Russian)
medinskiy_vr in Twitter
Official Blog in LiveJournal
Vladimir Rostislavovich Medinsky in VKontakte
Official Video blog in Russia.ru
blog in Echo Moscow

1970 births
Living people
People from Smila
Russian people of Ukrainian descent
United Russia politicians
Culture ministers of Russia
1st class Active State Councillors of the Russian Federation
Fourth convocation members of the State Duma (Russian Federation)
Fifth convocation members of the State Duma (Russian Federation)
Culture ministers
Russian bloggers
Russian nationalists
Russian anti-communists
Moscow State Institute of International Relations alumni
Commanders of the Order of Cultural Merit (Monaco)
21st-century Russian politicians